Francisco Montero may refer to:

 Francisco Montero (footballer, born 1952), Peruvian footballer
 Francisco Montero, Spanish footballer, see Javi Montero
 Francisco Arano Montero (born 1950), Mexican politician